Bhutan has diplomatic relations with 54 of 193 member states of the United Nations and the European Union. Bhutan's limited number of such relations, including the absence of formal relations with any of the permanent members of the United Nations Security Council, is part of a deliberate isolationist policy of limiting foreign influence in the state. This stance has been safeguarded by close relations with India, of which Bhutan has previously been considered a protected state.

In 1971, sponsored by India, Bhutan began to develop its foreign relations by joining the United Nations. In 1981, Bhutan joined the International Monetary Fund and World Bank, followed by the World Health Organization and UNESCO in 1982. It is also an active member of the South Asian Association for Regional Cooperation (SAARC). Bhutan is currently a member of 45 international organizations.

Under Article 20 of the Constitution of Bhutan enacted in 2008, Bhutan's foreign relations fall under the purview of the Druk Gyalpo on the advice of the Executive, namely the Prime Minister and other Ministers of the Lhengye Zhungtshog including the Minister of Foreign Affairs.

Diplomatic relations
Bhutan has embassies in Bangladesh, Belgium, India, Kuwait, Australia and Thailand. Conversely, only Bangladesh, India, and Kuwait have embassies in Thimphu. Moreover, Denmark has a representative office in Thimphu. Israel is the latest country to establish diplomatic relations with Bhutan. The following is a list of countries which have established diplomatic relations with Bhutan.

Asia

Bangladesh

Bangladesh is one of only three nations to maintain a residential embassy in Thimphu. Bhutan was the first country in the world to recognize Bangladeshi independence in 1971. The two states have agreed to develop hydropower in the Himalayas, as well as initiate free trade and transshipment through Bangladeshi ports. They also cooperate in water resources management.
Both Bhutan and Bangladesh are members of SAARC and BIMSTEC.

China

Bhutan has no diplomatic relations with its northern neighbor, the People's Republic of China, and is one of the few countries to not recognise or have relations with either of the Two Chinas. The border between Bhutan and the PRC has been closed since the invasion of Tibet in 1950, causing an influx of refugees. The border also remains undelineated; in 1961 China published a map that altered the traditional border. Tensions have since lessened, especially after the signing of a 1998 agreement on border peace and tranquility, the first bilateral agreement between China and Bhutan. Despite the lack of formal diplomatic relations, Bhutan has also maintained an Honorary Consul in Macau since 2000 and Hong Kong since 2004.

In late 2005, Bhutan claimed that PLA soldiers were building roads and bridges within Bhutanese territory. Bhutanese Foreign Minister Khandu Wangchuk took up the matter with Chinese authorities after the issue was raised in the Bhutanese parliament. In response, Foreign Ministry spokesman Qin Gang of the People's Republic of China has said that the border remains in dispute and that the two sides are continuing to work for a peaceful and cordial resolution of the dispute. The Bhutanese newspaper Kuensel has said that China might use the roads to further Chinese claims along the border.

India

Historically, ties with India have been close. Both countries signed a first ever Friendship treaty in 1865 between Bhutan and British India. When Bhutan became a monarchy, British India was the first country to recognize it and renewed the treaty in 1910. Bhutan was the first country to recognize Indian independence and renewed the age old treaty with the new government in 1949, including a clause that India would assist Bhutan in foreign relations. On February 8, 2007, the Indo-Bhutan Friendship Treaty was substantially revised under the Bhutanese King, Jigme Khesar Namgyel Wangchuck. In the Treaty of 1949 Article 2 read as "The Government of India undertakes to exercise no interference in the internal administration of Bhutan. On its part the Government of Bhutan agrees to be guided by the advice of the Government of India in regard to its external relations." In the revised treaty this now reads as, "In keeping with the abiding ties of close friendship and cooperation between Bhutan and India, the Government of the Kingdom of Bhutan and the Government of the Republic of India shall cooperate closely with each other on issues relating to their national interests. Neither government shall allow the use of its territory for activities harmful to the national security and interest of the other." The revised treaty also includes in it the preamble "Reaffirming their respect for each other's independence, sovereignty and territorial integrity", an element that was absent in the earlier version. The Indo-Bhutan Friendship Treaty of 2007 strengthens Bhutan's status as an independent and sovereign nation.

There also exists bi-lateral agreement between Bhutanese and Indian Government where-in citizens of both nations can travel freely in other country without passport and visa.

Israel

Bhutan and Israel established formal diplomatic relations in 2020, with the key areas of cooperation being economic, technological and agricultural development.

Nepal

Nepal and Bhutan established relations in 1983. However, since 1992, relations with Nepal have been tense due to the repatriation of refugees from Bhutan.

Philippines
The Philippines and Bhutan have no formal relations yet. The Philippines has an embassy in New Delhi, India as representative to dialogues with Bhutan. Numerous senators and high-profile personalities from the Philippines have visited Bhutan and have been pushing for the Gross National Happiness to also be applied in the Philippines, citing its effectiveness and efficiency in nation-building, environmental and cultural conservation, and human rights upholding. Filipino senator Loren Legarda, a United Nations Global Champion for Resilience, has been pushing for greater diplomatic relations between the two countries. In September 2014, the Prime Minister of Bhutan visited the Philippines and the Asian Development Bank headquarters in Manila. In 2018, the Philippines sent its engineers to Bhutan's capital in a bid to develop Bhutan's space program that will be launched in May.

South Korea
Bhutan and South Korea established formal relations on 24 September 1987. South Korea granted Bhutan a total of US$6.21 million in aid between 1987 and 2012. Imports into South Korea are about $382,000 and imports into Bhutan are about $3.27 million.

Other countries

Russia

Turkey
Both countries established diplomatic relations in 2012. Bhutan and Turkey cooperate through their respective embassies in New Delhi. Trade volume between the two countries was 1.58 million USD in 2018 (Bhutanese exports/imports: 1.48/0.1 million USD).

United States

The United States and Bhutan have no official diplomatic ties, however, they both maintain "warm, informal relations" with each other, as well as consular relations.

Bhutan is represented by its permanent mission in the United Nations, while the American embassy in New Delhi is currently accredited for Bhutan.

Transnational issues
Bhutan has relations with other nations based on transnational issues. Among these issues are extradition, terrorism, and refugees. To a limited extent, Bhutanese law provides frameworks for cooperation with countries which Bhutan has no formal mission.

Extradition
Bhutan has a legislated policy on extradition of criminals, both to and from the kingdom. Any nation, with or without formal relations, may request the extradition of fugitives who abscond to Bhutan. The Extradition Act requires nations to provide "all relevant evidence and information" about the accused, after which the Royal Government may in its discretion refer the matter to the High Court of Bhutan. The Court may then issue a summons or warrant, conduct an inquiry, and collect evidence, holding the accused for a maximum of 30 days. Alternatively, the Royal Government may refer the matter to the courts for trial within Bhutan. Bhutan imposes punishments for offenses committed in treaty states generally, and for offenses in other states resulting in return to Bhutan. Offenses are weighed according to gravity, determined by a schedule and two-part test: extraditable offenses are those enumerated (including murder, theft, forgery, and smuggling), or which in Bhutan would be punished by a prison term exceeding twelve months. All felonies in Bhutan are punishable by a minimum of three years' imprisonment.

Bhutan will refuse requests for extradition if the Royal Government or its courts determine the person is accused of a political offense.

International cooperation against terrorism
Bhutan cooperates with India to expel Nagaland separatists; lacking any treaty describing the boundary, Bhutan and China continue negotiations to establish a common boundary alignment to resolve territorial disputes arising from substantial cartographic discrepancies, the largest of which lie in Bhutan's northwest and along the Chumbi salient.

Refugee resettlement

The U.S. has offered to resettle 60,000 of the 107,000 Bhutanese refugees of Nepalese origin now living in seven U.N. refugee camps in southeastern Nepal. Six other nations—Australia, Canada, Norway, Netherlands, New Zealand and Denmark—have offered to resettle 10,000 each.

Other countries also operate resettlement programs in the camps. Norway has already settled 200 Bhutanese refugees, and Canada has agreed to accept up to 5,000 through to 2012.

See also
 Bhutan House
 List of diplomatic missions in Bhutan
 List of diplomatic missions of Bhutan

Notes and references

Further reading 
 
 Matteo Miele, Chinese Shadows on Bhutanese Independence after the Treaty of Punakha. The Tibetan Buddhist Connection and the British Diplomatic Action, in Seiji Kumagai (ed.), Buddhism, Culture and Society in Bhutan, Vajra Publications, Kathmandu, 2018, pp. 215–239

External links